Catoptronotum bipenicillatum is a species of beetle in the family Cerambycidae, the only species in the genus Catoptronotum.

References

Hesperophanini